Blues on Bach is an album by American jazz group the Modern Jazz Quartet recorded in 1973 and released on the Atlantic label. The album includes five John Lewis arrangements of pieces by Johann Sebastian Bach, interspersed with four original blues pieces "on" [the name] "Bach"—in keys (and with titles) that spell out in order the name B-A-C-H.

The five pieces arranged from Bach originals are: "Regret?" from "The Old Year Has Now Passed Away"; "Rise Up in the Morning" from "Sleepers Wake"; "Precious Joy" from "Jesu, Joy of Man's Desiring"; "Don't Stop This Train" from a selection in "Klavierbüchlein für Wilhelm Friedemann Bach"; and "Tears from the Children" from the Prelude 8 in E-flat minor from Book I of "The Well-Tempered Clavier").

For the four blues pieces, the "spelling" of the titles follows the system Bach and his German contemporaries used, in which the letter B indicates B-flat, and the letter H is B-natural. So, the four blues pieces that spell the name B-A-C-H are in the keys of B-flat (major), A (minor), C (minor) and B (major).

Reception
The Allmusic review stated "This album has an interesting concept, alternating four original blues with five adaptations of melodies [sic] from classical works by Bach. The Modern Jazz Quartet had long been quite adept in both areas, and despite a certain lack of variety on this set (alternating back and forth between the two styles somewhat predictably), the music is largely enjoyable".

Track listing
All compositions by John Lewis except as indicated
 "Regret?" - 2:04   
 "Blues in B Flat" - 4:56   
 "Rise Up in the Morning" - 3:28   
 "Blues in A Minor" - 7:53   
 "Precious Joy" - 3:12   
 "Blues in C Minor" (Milt Jackson) - 7:58   
 "Don't Stop This Train" - 1:45   
 "Blues in H (B)" (Jackson) - 5:46   
 "Tears from the Children" - 4:25

Personnel
Milt Jackson - vibraphone
John Lewis - piano, harpsichord
Percy Heath - bass
Connie Kay - drums

References

Atlantic Records albums
Modern Jazz Quartet albums
1972 albums
Albums produced by Nesuhi Ertegun